"Pauvres Diables" is a song by Julio Iglesias recorded in 1979. The song is also commonly known as "Vous les femmes" based on the opening lyrics. The song was also recorded in Spanish language by Iglesias as "Pobre diablo".

The song has been recorded by many artists including Johnny Hallyday and later by Arno in the film score for 2013 film Les Garçons et Guillaume, à table! (English title Me, Myself and Mum)

In 2014, the song was reinterpreted by Nuno Resende, Julio Iglesias Jr. and Damien Sargue as "Vous les femmes (Pobre diablo)" in the covers compilation album Latin Lovers.

1979 songs
French-language songs
Julio Iglesias songs